Danielle Hardiman (born 7 December 1994) is an Australian rules footballer with the North Melbourne Football Club in the AFL Women's (AFLW). She was drafted by Carlton with the club's fifth selection and the thirty fifth overall in the 2016 AFL Women's draft. She made her debut in Round 1, 2017, in the club and the league's inaugural match at Ikon Park against . In May 2018, Hardiman signed with expansion club, North Melbourne, to play with the club in the 2019 AFLW season. It was revealed she signed on with the club for two more seasons on 17 June 2021, tying her to the club until the end of 2023.

References

External links

Living people
1994 births
Carlton Football Club (AFLW) players
Australian rules footballers from Victoria (Australia)
Sportswomen from Victoria (Australia)
North Melbourne Football Club (AFLW) players
Victorian Women's Football League players